Columbia Place (formerly Columbia Mall) is one of South Carolina's largest shopping malls, with nearly  of retail space. The mall is located just off Interstate 20 and Interstate 77 on Two Notch Road in Columbia, South Carolina. The mall's current only anchor store is Macy's.

Stores 
Opened in 1977 as Columbia Mall, it was originally anchored by Belk, JCPenney, and Sears. Rich's opened a few months later. Dillard's replaced Belk in 1995 and closed on November 4, 2008. JCPenney left the mall for a new lifestyle center, Village at Sandhill, located 10 miles (16 km) away in 2007. On June 6, 2017, Sears announced that they would be closing as part of a plan to close 72 stores nationwide. The store closed in September 2017. It is home to the only Macy's location in more than a 50-mile radius, which helps solidify the mall's presence and position in the market. On January 19, 2018, Burlington announced that they would be closing as well on February 16, 2018.

The two-level mall added an 8 unit food court in 1997 and received its first renovation in 2002.

The road that loops the mall's parking lot is known as Columbia Mall Boulevard and is the address for many outlying businesses including McDonald's, Party City, and Virginia College.

Ownership 
Columbia Place was built by Kahn Development Company and the Richard E. Jacobs Group and was purchased by CBL & Associates Properties in 2001. For a period of time the mall was leased and managed by Spinoso Real Estate Group of North Syracuse, New York after being lost by owner CBL & Associates Properties in a foreclosure action. CBL & Associates Properties also lost their former Citadel Mall property in Charleston, South Carolina in 2013 after foreclosure.

On October 31, 2014, Las Vegas real estate investor, Moonbeam Capital Investments acquired Columbia Place Mall.

References

External links 
 Shopcolumbiaplace.com—Official Website
 Moonbeam Capital Investments

Shopping malls established in 1977
Shopping malls in South Carolina
Buildings and structures in Columbia, South Carolina
Tourist attractions in Columbia, South Carolina